is a Japanese former cyclist. He competed in the team pursuit event at the 1976 Summer Olympics and 1978 Asian Games. He was also a professional keirin cyclist.

References

External links
 

1957 births
Living people
Japanese male cyclists
Olympic cyclists of Japan
Cyclists at the 1976 Summer Olympics
Place of birth missing (living people)
Keirin cyclists
Asian Games medalists in cycling
Cyclists at the 1978 Asian Games
Medalists at the 1978 Asian Games
Asian Games gold medalists for Japan